Magnum Foundation is a non-profit, photographic foundation located in New York City with a mission to expand diversity and creativity in documentary photography.

History and mission 
Magnum Foundation was founded in 2007, in the midst of the collapse of the media system that had traditionally supported photographic reporting. Founded by the photographers of the Magnum Photos collective, including board president Susan Meiselas, the organization was conceived as an initiative to support independent, long-form visual storytelling on social issues. As photojournalism practices diversify, the foundation seeks to develop and experiment with new models for documentary photography projects.

Magnum Foundation seeks to create and support a global network of social justice and human rights-focused photographers. The foundation works to preserve the histories of humanistic and documentary photography, including the larger Magnum Photos community estate.

Programs

Arab Documentary Photography Program 
The Arab Documentary Photography Program (ADPP) supports and mentors photographers from across the Arab region. ADPP is jointly funded by the Prince Claus Fund and the Arab Fund for Arts and Culture. It seeks to amplify non-stereotypical and unconventional visual documentation of social issues and narratives relevant to the Arab region. It aims to raise the level of documentary photography in the Arab region, to train photographers and expand their approaches to visual storytelling, to share strong visual narratives from the Arab region regionally and internationally, and to explore wider access to documentary photography and a more active engagement with its audiences. Each year, ten grantees are chosen through an open call for proposals. Mentors for the program are photographers Peter van Agtmael, Tanya Habjouqa, Eric Gottesman, and Randa Shaath.

Archives and research 
Magnum Foundation draws on the legacy of Magnum Photos, which was founded in 1947 as a photographic cooperative that would allow for the creation and dissemination of visual images unencumbered by the constraints of for-profit journalism. Magnum Photos has evolved into one of the world’s most influential photographic organisations, producing diverse images and content that educate and shape perceptions of world events. Magnum Foundation leads the process of identifying collections and estate holdings of work by Magnum photographers and to connect these materials through an online consortium.

Inge Morath Award 

The Inge Morath Award is given annually to a woman photographer under 30 years of age to support the completion of a long-term documentary photography project. The Award was established by Magnum Photos as a tribute to Inge Morath, who was associated with Magnum for more than fifty years and was one of the first women in the field. The awardee and finalists are selected by the full membership of Magnum Photos during its Annual General Meeting. The award is administered by the Magnum Foundation in partnership with the Inge Morath Foundation.

Magnum Foundation Fellowship 
The Magnum Foundation Fellowship offers mentorship and stipends to photojournalism students and recent graduates. Fellows produce a story around New York City on an underreported or emerging issue. Throughout the fellowship they build relationships with subjects, seek partnerships with organizations, and experiment with multimedia. Calls for applications are announced throughout the year on a rolling basis.

Magnum Foundation Fund 
Formerly known as the Magnum Emergency Fund, it was renamed as the Magnum Foundation Fund in 2017. The Fund supports photographers who are experimenting with new models of socially engaged practice. Through production grants, mentorship, and project development assistance, the Magnum Foundation Fund fosters diversity and creativity in documentary photography and related practices. In collaboration with the Prince Claus Fund, the Magnum Foundation Fund supports both emerging and experienced photographers. The Magnum Foundation Fund is by nomination only – typically educators, editors, curators, and critics with expertise in specific areas around the globe – so as to try to ensure a geographically diverse pool of proposals.

Photography and Social Justice 
The Photography and Social Justice Program supports and trains early career and emerging photographers, artists, journalists, scholars, and activists who want to pursue social equality and advance human rights through photography.

The Photography and Social Justice Program builds capacity and community among a diverse, international network of Fellows who have not had access to mentorship or training in photography but can demonstrate a commitment to activism and social justice. Priority is given to applicants from regions and communities where freedom of expression is limited. Using New York City as a cultural resource, the program provides space for interdisciplinary experimentation and cross-cultural, critical discourse around photography and social justice. The program has twice yearly laboratories, held at CUNY’s Graduate School of Journalism in New York City that include technical trainings, lectures, and discussions exploring photography as a medium for social engagement.

Publications 
Through collaboration and partnerships, Magnum Foundation coproduces books of historic and contemporary documentary photography.
 Bruce Davidson: An Illustrated Biography by Vicki Goldberg. Munich: Prestel. .
 Eve Arnold: Magnum Legacy by Janine di Giovanni. Munich: Prestel. .
 Negative Publicity: Artefacts of Extraordinary Rendition by Edmund Clark and Crofton Black. New York City: Aperture. .
 Afghanistan by Larry Towell. New York City: Aperture.
 Laying Foundations for Change: Capital Investments of The Atlantic Philanthropies. Magnum Foundation; Atlantic Philanthropies, 2014. Edition of 5000 copies. . Given free to funders, philanthropy advisors and social investors.

Grantees and fellows

Notes

References

Non-profit organizations based in New York City
Photojournalism organizations